Amorphoscelis laxeretis is a species of praying mantis found in Ivory Coast, Ghana, Equatorial Guinea (Fernando Po), and Togo.

See also
List of mantis genera and species

References

Amorphoscelis
Insects of Equatorial Guinea
Insects of West Africa
Taxa named by Ferdinand Karsch
Insects described in 1894